Ceraea or Keraia, also known as Cerea or Kerea (Κερέα), Ceraeae or Keraiai (Κεραῖαι), was a town of ancient Crete. It is mentioned by Polybius, and minted coins similar to those of Polyrrhenia in antiquity.

The site of Ceraea is tentatively located near modern Meskla.

References

Populated places in ancient Crete
Former populated places in Greece